Aylin Aslım (born 14 February 1976) is a Turkish singer, songwriter and actress.

Aylin Aslım was born in Lich, Hessen, Germany into a Turkish family but moved to Turkey when she was only one year old. She sang in several rock and electronica bands in several night clubs in Istanbul. Her first album Gelgit, released in 2001, was more of an electronic album. However, she switched back to rock in her later releases, one of which is her second album, "Gülyabani", which was released in 2005.

As of mid 2010s, Aslım lives in Kaş, where she owns the Gagarin Bar.
In November 2020 she married Utku Vargı. On April 23 2021, she gave birth to her first child Orman Umut Çağlan.

Discography

Gelgit (2000) 
 Senin Gibi
 Dalgalar
 Zor Günler
 Yıldızlar Var
 Keşke
 4 Gün 4 Gece
 Birgün
 Küçük Sevgilim
 Aynı
 Senin Gibi (Aylin Gibi)

Senin Gibi's 2nd version "Aylin Gibi" was included in the 2nd edition of the Gelgit album.

Gülyabani (2005) 
 İntro
 Gülyabani
 Ben Kalender Meşrebim
 Böyledir Bu İşler
 Kayıp Kızlar
 Sokak İnsanları
 Olduğun Gibi
 Hadi Buyur
 Güldünya
 Ahh
 Gelinlik Sarhoşluğu (Bana Ne) - feat. Ayben
 Beyoğlu Kimin Oğlu

Canını Seven Kaçsın (2009) 
 Sen mi
 Kızlar Anlar
 Hoşuna Gitmedi mi (Kızkaçıran)
 Güzel Gözlu Güzel Çocuk
 İçtim İçtim
 Aşk Geri Gelir (Music Video)
 K.A.L.P.
 Güzel Günler

Zümrüdüanka (2013) 
 İki Zavallı Kuş - feat. Teoman
 Ölünür de
 Hasret
 Küçük Bey
 Zümrüdüanka
 Af
 İşte Sana Bir Tango
 Usta

Filmography 

 Son (TV series, 2012): Selen
 Şarkı Söyleyen Kadınlar (2014)
 Adana İşi (2015): Kontes

References

External links 
  Official website
 Aylin Aslım on MySpace

1976 births
Living people
People from Lich, Germany
Women rock singers
Turkish pop singers
Turkish rock singers
21st-century Turkish actresses
Turkish film actresses
21st-century Turkish women singers
21st-century Turkish singers